The Fox Hollow Festival or Fox Hollow Festival of Traditional Music and Arts was a folk festival held on the estate of folksingers Bob and Evelyne Beers in Petersburgh, New York each summer from 1966 to 1980, usually in August.

References 

Folk festivals in the United States